Catelliglobosispora koreensis is a species of bacteria from the family Micromonosporaceae. Catelliglobosispora koreensis has been isolated from soil from a gold mine cave from Kongju in Korea.

References 

Micromonosporaceae
Bacteria described in 2008
Monotypic bacteria genera